Oxya yezoensis is a species of rice-field grasshopper native to Japan. Referred to in Japanese as kobane-inago, it is a popular species of food insect, and is commonly cooked with soy sauce, sugar and sweet wine.

References

yezoensis
Insects described in 1910